Caique Ferreira da Silva Leite (born September 23, 1992 in Rio de Janeiro), or simply Caique Valdivia, is a Brazilian footballer who plays as a midfielder for ASA.

Career 
He moved to K League Classic side Seongnam FC on loan in 2014.

References

External links

Valdivia at ZeroZero

1992 births
Living people
Brazilian footballers
Brazilian expatriate footballers
K League 1 players
Campeonato Brasileiro Série B players
Agremiação Sportiva Arapiraquense players
Seongnam FC players
Esporte Clube Juventude players
Expatriate footballers in South Korea
Brazilian expatriate sportspeople in South Korea
Association football midfielders
Footballers from Rio de Janeiro (city)